Omega X (stylized in all caps) is a South Korean boy band formed in 2021. The group consists of 11 members: Jaehan, Hwichan, Sebin, Hangyeom, Taedong, Xen, Jehyun, Kevin, Junghoon, Hyuk and Yechan.

History

Pre-debut
All of Omega X's members had appeared in survival shows or debuted in previous K-pop groups before debuting in Omega X. Hangyeom is a former member of Seven O'Clock who also participated in Mix Nine, finishing in 6th place. Jaehan was a contestant on Produce 101 Season 2 and a former member of Spectrum. Hwichan also participated in Mix Nine and is a former member of Limitless. Sebin is a member of Snuper and participated in The Unit: Idol Rebooting Project. Taedong participated in Boys24 and Produce 101 Season 2, and is a former member of Gidongdae. Xen and Jehyun are former members of 1Team. Kevin, Junghoon and Hyuk are former members of ENOi. Yechan participated in Under Nineteen and is a former member of 1the9.

2021: Debut with Vamos and What's Goin' On
On June 30, Omega X debuted with the release of their first EP, Vamos, and its lead single of the same name.

On September 6, Omega X released their first single album, What's Goin' On, and its lead single of the same name.

2022: Love Me Like, Story Written in Music and Japanese debut
On January 5, Omega X released their second EP, Love Me Like, and its lead single of the same name.

On June 15, Omega X released their first studio album, Story Written in Music and its title track "Play Dumb".

On August 24, Omega X made their Japanese debut under Tokuma Shoten with the mini album Stand Up! and the title track of the same name was pre-released on July 1.

2023–present: Return after lawsuit win and Dream 
On February 11, 2023, a month after winning the lawsuit against their former label, Omega X attended and performed at the second day of the awarding ceremony of the 30th Hanteo Music Awards. The group also revealed their new song, Dream, which was composed by Hangyeom and written by the members, during the event.

Abuse allegations
On October 24, 2022, a video was leaked showing the CEO of Spire Entertainment physically and verbally abusing members of the group as one of them faints. On the same day, Spire Entertainment released a statement claiming that both Omega X and the label had "resolved all their misunderstandings" while the CEO denied any abuse having taken place. The following day, SBS shared a new video taken by a fan showing the CEO verbally abusing the members outside a concert venue, with one member undergoing a panic attack.

On November 5, the group created a new Instagram separate from the label, where they announced their intentions to continue as a group and communicate with their fans. On November 7, Spire released another apology in response to the Instagram post by Omega X, as well as announcing the resignation of the company's CEO to prevent future incidents. On November 11, SBS revealed more allegations against the company such as them forcing the group to perform despite testing positive for COVID-19, and a new video of the initial yelling incident, revealing that the CEO yelled at the members for not properly thanking her or the company during their live concert. Despite this, the company only issued a brief statement reaffirming the earlier apology and resignation of the CEO.

On November 14, it was announced that a press conference would be held with the members on November 16 for a special announcement. Ahead of the press conference the group filed a trademark for their name as well as the fanbase, For X. It was also revealed by their legal representative that the group suffered assault, intimidation, sexual harassment, gaslighting, and other forms of abuse. During the press conference, it was announced that Omega X would be filing a lawsuit to terminate their contracts against Spire Entertainment.

On January 11, 2023, Omega X announced that they had won their lawsuit and their contracts with Spire were suspended.

Members
Adapted from their Naver profile and official website.
Jaehan (재한) - leader
Hwichan (휘찬)
Sebin (세빈)
Hangyeom (한겸)
Taedong (태동)
Xen (젠)
Jehyun (제현)
Kevin (케빈)
Junghoon (정훈)
Hyuk (혁)
Yechan (예찬)

Discography

Studio albums

Extended plays

Single albums

Singles

Soundtrack appearances

Filmography

Web shows

Radio show

Ambassadorship 

 Honorary ambassador for Jeju Tourism, 2021
 Ambassador for COEX Urban Park Festival, 2021
 Public Relations Ambassador for Asia Exchange Association, 2021
 Honorary Ambassador for The Association For International Sport for All (TAFISA), 2021
 Public Relations Ambassador for COEX Winter Gallery 2021

Awards and nominations

Listicles

Notes

References 

K-pop music groups
Musical groups established in 2021
South Korean boy bands
South Korean pop music groups
South Korean dance music groups
Musical groups from Seoul
2021 establishments in South Korea